Lake Louise is a hamlet within Banff National Park in Alberta, Canada. The nearby lake, framed by mountains, is one of the most famous mountain vistas in the world; the famous Chateau Lake Louise also overlooks the lake.

History 

Prior to the arrival of Europeans, Indigenous peoples lived in the foothills and forests of the Rocky Mountains - including what is today Lake Louise, where they hunted bison and other big game animals. In the Stoney language of the Nakoda people the area is called , meaning "lake of the little fishes".

During the 1870s, the construction of the Canadian Pacific Railway (CPR) started. The railway was planned to run through Bow Valley. A Nakoda guide took CPR workman Tom Wilson to the site in 1882, and Wilson named it Emerald Lake. The hamlet was later called Holt City, and then Laggan, before being renamed Lake Louise. A ca. 1890 CPR station was replaced in 1910 but continued to be used by the railway company for other purposes until it was donated in 1976 to Heritage Park Historical Village in Calgary. The depot was moved to the park and restored to the era when the Lake Louise village was called Laggan. The 1910 station was declared a heritage railway station by the federal government in 1991, and has been preserved and today operates as a restaurant.

Lake Louise was added to Banff National Park in 1892, and has since become a tourist destination made accessible by its location off the Trans-Canada Highway.

Geography 

The hamlet is in Division No. 15, one of 19 census divisions of Alberta and the federal riding of Banff—Airdrie.

The background of Lake Louise is filled with views of several snow-capped mountains, including Mount Temple, Mount Whyte, and Mount Niblock.

Climate 
Lake Louise experiences a subarctic climate (Köppen climate classification Dfc). Summers consist of frosty mornings and crisp, cool days. Snow can occur in any month of the year. Since lower elevations on said latitude have humid continental climates instead, it may also be described as a subalpine climate. Because of its high diurnal air temperature variation and high altitude, the frost-free period averages only 14 days.

Demographics 
Lake Louise recorded a population of 691 in the 2011 Census of Population conducted by Statistics Canada. Residents often change year to year, with workers in the service and tourism industries moving to the area for work.

Attractions 

Lake Louise features a shopping centre named Samson Mall. Lake Louise Ski Resort, a downhill ski area, is located across Highway 1. Chateau Lake Louise is southwest of the community on the shores of the lake.

Government 
Lake Louise is administered by Improvement District No. 9.

Infrastructure 
The Trans-Canada Highway (Highway 1) runs adjacent to the community while Highway 1A begins at the entrance to the community. The southern terminus of the Icefields Parkway (Highway 93) is just north of the community.

See also 
List of communities in Alberta
List of hamlets in Alberta
List of communities in Canada by elevation

Bibliography 
 Discover Lake Louise
 Lake Louise Britannica
 The Canadian Encyclopedia, Lake Louise
 The Canadian Encyclopedia, Chateau Lake Louise
 Banff, Lake Louise History
 The Rocky Mountaineer

References

External links 

 

Banff National Park
Hamlets in Alberta